Nusret Khel is an administrative unit (Union Council) of the Kohat District in the Khyber Pakhtunkhwa province, Pakistan.

Kohat District has two tehsils, Kohat and Lachi. Each tehsil is composed of union councils.  There are 27 union councils in the district. Nusrat Khel is located on Hangu Road in Kohat.

See also 

 Kohat District

External links
Khyber-Pakhtunkhwa Government website section on Lower Dir
United Nations
Hajjinfo.org Uploads
 PBS paiman.jsi.com

Kohat District
Populated places in Kohat District
Union councils of Khyber Pakhtunkhwa
Union Councils of Kohat District